The AAA World Cruiserweight Championship (Campeonato Mundial Crucero AAA in Spanish) is a professional wrestling championship contested for in the Mexican lucha libre promotion Lucha Libre AAA Worldwide (AAA). Traditionally this division is labelled as the "Junior Heavyweight" division in Mexico while "Cruiserweight" is a term more used in the United States or Canada.

The championship was originally named the AAA Cruiserweight Championship. but had the word "world" added to the name after El Hijo del Fantasma won a match on August 17, 2014, that unified the championship with the AAA Fusión Championship. A total of twelve men have held the championship for a total of fourteen different title reigns. Fénix is the current champion in his first reign.

History

The inaugural champion was Alex Koslov, who defeated Alan Stone and Xtreme Tiger at AAA Television Taping on May 21, 2009, in Aguascalientes, Aguascalientes. On August 17, 2014, at  Triplemanía XXII, the Cruiserweight Champion Daga defended the title in a 10-man elimination match, where also participated the AAA Fusion Champion Fénix. El Hijo del Fantasma won the match and unified both titles, deactivating the Fusion Championship and renaming the title as AAA World Cruiserweight Championship. On February 10, 2021, the champion Laredo Kid faced the Major League Wrestling's World Middleweight Champion Lio Rush in a title vs. title match. Despide Rush won the match and was recognized as champion, few days later AAA didn't recognized the title change. Instead, Laredo Kid appeared on AAA show with the title belt. According to Konnan, an AAA booker, Rush lost the title back to Laredo Kid in a un-televised match. On May 5, Laredo Kid appeared in MLW Fusion with the AAA title, making a in-character statement where he refused to recognize Rush as champion.

The current champion, Laredo Kid, has been the longest reigning champion at + days. The youngest champion is Daga who won at the age of 24 years and 136 days. During his reign, Laredo Kid was defeated by Lio Rush in a unification match to unify the AAA World Cruiserweight Championship with Rush's MLW World Middleweight Championship – though this reign was not recognized by AAA. The shortest reigning champion was Alex Koslov who held the title for 9 days from August 21, 2009 to August 30, 2009. Alex Koslov and Xtreme Tiger has held the title the most times with 2 championship reigns. The oldest champion is Juventud Guerrera who won at the age of 37 years and 178 days.

Reigns 
Names

Combined reigns 

References

External links
AAA's official title history

Lucha Libre AAA Worldwide championships
World professional wrestling championships
Cruiserweight wrestling championships